Anne, Duke of Montmorency, Honorary Knight of the Garter (15 March 1493, Chantilly, Oise12 November 1567, Paris) was a French soldier, statesman and diplomat. He became Marshal of France and Constable of France and served five kings.

Early life
Montmorency was born at Chantilly to William of Montmorency and Anne St. Pol. He was named for his godmother, Anne of Brittany. His father had a senior status in the household of Francis, Count of Angoulême (the future King Francis I). Montmorency first saw military action at the battle of Ravenna in 1512.

Reign of Francis I
When Francis acceded to the French throne in January 1515, Montmorency became an influential member of his court. When the king reasserted the French claim to Milan the same year, Montmorency followed his king into Italy and distinguished himself at Marignano.

Montmorency was named captain of the Bastille in 1516 and became governor of Novara. In 1518 he was one of the hostages in England for Francis I's debt to Henry VIII for the city of Tournai. He returned to France to attend a short and unsuccessful peace conference between the French and the Holy Roman Empire in May 1519. The following year he was present at the Field of the Cloth of Gold and afterwards had charge of diplomatic negotiations in England when relations between the two countries again began to sour.

In August 1521, Montmorency helped to command the defence of Mézières against the Imperial German army. In the same year he commanded the Swiss in Italy. His troops were defeated in the Battle of La Bicocca on 27 April 1522, but he was made Marshal of France in recognition of his courage.

Montmorency spent the next three years defending northern France against the English invasion of 1523. By that time England had allied with the Holy Roman Empire. In 1524 he again joined Francis I in a campaign to retake Milan. On 24 February 1525, an army of Italians, Spanish and Germans defeated the French at the Battle of Pavia and captured both de Montmorency and his king. Both were sent to Spain but Montmorency was released soon afterwards. He was one of the negotiators of the Treaty of Madrid in 1526 and attended his king when he was exchanged for his two eldest sons. In 1530 he returned the king's sons to France.

On 23 March 1526, Anne de Montmorency was named Grand Master of France charged with supervision of the royal household and the king's private service. In the same year he was granted the governership of Languedoc, an office he would hold throughout the following decades with a brief gap during his disgrace. In 1527 he married Madeleine, the daughter of René of Savoy. He supported the king's efforts to form an alliance against Charles V. He worked with Cardinal Wolsey to form an alliance between Francis I and Henry VIII in 1527. This led to a new war against the Holy Roman Empire that ended with the Peace of Cambrai.

In 1536, Francis I invaded the Duchy of Savoy, against the advice of Montmorency, staking claim to the lands of the duchy but also to pressure Charles V to give Milan back to him. Charles V invaded Provence from Northern Italy in retaliation. Francis appointed Montmorency, who had now retired from the court, the lieutenant general in the southeast of France and they led the defence of Provence using scorched earth tactics. Montmorency evacuated Aix-en-Provence and concentrated his forces near Avignon. By the early autumn Charles V had been forced to retreat his army to Genoa and lift the siege of Marseille.

Montmorency joined the king in Picardy and at the end of the Netherlands campaign marched to relieve Turin. He led the French troops in 1537 when they attacked Artois in the Netherlands and captured many towns before the ten-year truce. On 10 February 1538 the king made him Constable of France. Around this time he also commissioned a Pietà (Louvre) from Francis' court artist Rosso Fiorentino.

Afterwards Montmorency begun to support peace with the Holy Roman Emperor, against the prevailing attitude of the court. He renewed negotiations with the Holy Roman Empire and encouraged the Pope Paul III to create a settlement. He managed to get the two kings to meet at Aigues-Mortes in July 1538. According to the deal he had brokered, Francis expected that Charles V would give Milan to one of Francis' sons as a sign of alliance, but Charles gave the title to his son Philip.

As a result of this diplomatic failure, Montmorency lost favour at court. Francis I turned to his rivals Cardinal Tournon, Claude d'Annebault and his mistress Anne de Pisseleu d'Heilly, the Duchess of Étampes. Montmorency retired from court in June 1541. On 21 May 1542 Francis abolished all governorships, forbidding his subjects to heed the commands of their former governors. In the following weeks Francis created new commissions for all the other ex-governors bar Montmorency, it is thus apparent this was a circuitous method of relieving him specifically of his titles. He continued to maintain correspondence with the prince Henry.

Henry II
Montmorency did not return to public life until the accession of Henry II in March 1547. The new king gave him back all his former offices and dismissed the duchesse d'Étampes and her followers. In 1548 Montmorency crushed the insurrections in the southwest, particularly at Bordeaux. From 1549-50 Montmorency led the war in the Boulonnais, negotiating the treaty for the surrender of Boulogne on 24 March 1550. As a reward the king created him a duke and peer of France and in 1551 his barony was expanded into a duchy. Soon afterwards his armies fought in the northeast when the French army seized Metz, Toul and Verdun. Montmorency's attempt to relieve St Quentin on 10 August 1557 led to his defeat and capture by Spanish Habsburg forces. He was not released until October 1558 at the Peace of Cateau-Cambrésis.

Francis II
By this time the Guises had supplanted him and the 15-year-old king Francis II treated him with indifference. Montmorency had to give up his Great Master status to the Duke of Guise. However, his son was appointed marshal by way of indemnity. He himself retired to his estates.

French Wars of Religion
On the accession of Charles IX in 1560 Montmorency again assumed his duties in the court. However, when his Protestant nephew Gaspard II de Coligny and the humanist chancellor Michel de l'Hôpital asserted influence over the young king's regency, the staunchly Catholic Montmorency left the court. In April 1561 he allied himself with Francis, Duke of Guise, his former enemy, and Jacques d'Albon, Marshal Saint-Andre to form the Triumvirate, an association for the defense of Catholicism.

Montmorency was a leading military commander in the French Wars of Religion. On 19 April 1562, Catherine de Medici concerned over rising Huguenot influence, summoned the Triumvirate. Montmorency petitioned the nuncio for money and troops, although at Catherine's insist, the Triumvirate wrote to Philip II appealing for Spanish military support. By June 1562, Montmorency and the Triumvirate's Catholic army were near Jargeau facing Conde's Huguenot army. After some strategic maneuvering by both Catholic and Huguenot armies around Orleans and Blois, minor skirmishing broke out while Montmorency engaged in deceptive negotiations. At the Battle of Dreux on 19 December 1562, the only major battle of the war, he was captured early when the cavalry under him was routed. Montmorency's soldiers eventually won the battle, but it was one of the bloodiest of the 16th century. 

Montmorency helped negotiate the Edict of Amboise on 19 March 1563.

Death

In 1567 the French Wars of Religion resumed after Condé's failed coup attempt. On 10 November 1567, aged 74, Montmorency led the royal army to victory at Saint-Denis, but was fatally wounded and died two days later.

Children
His marriage produced twelve children:
François (1530–1579), succeeded his father as duke of Montmorency.
Henri (1534–1614), succeeded his elder brother as duke of Montmorency.
Charles (1537–1612), Admiral of France
Gabriel (1541–1562), killed at Battle of Dreux
Guillaume (1547-1593)
Eléonore (died 1557) married François de La Tour d'Auvergne (killed in 1557 at the Battle of St. Quentin), parents of Henri de La Tour d'Auvergne, Duke of Bouillon
Jeanne (1528–1596), married Louis III de La Trémoille.
Catherine (1532–1624) married Gilbert de Lévis, Duke of Ventadour and had issue; great great grandparents of Anne Geneviève de Lévis;
Marie
Anne
Louise
Madeleine

See also
 List of works by James Pradier

References

Sources and further reading

External links

1493 births
1567 deaths
People from Chantilly, Oise
Military personnel from Paris
Dukes of Montmorency
Anne
Marshals of France
Military leaders of the Italian Wars
French people of the French Wars of Religion
Constables of France
Grand Masters of France
Knights of the Garter
16th-century peers of France
Court of Henry II of France
Court of Francis I of France
Court of Francis II of France
Court of Charles IX of France